The 1993 Stanley Cup Finals  was the championship series of the National Hockey League's (NHL) 1992–93 season, and the culmination of the 1993 Stanley Cup playoffs. It was contested between the Los Angeles Kings and the Montreal Canadiens. It was the first appearance in the Final for the Kings and the first appearance since the 1920 Stanley Cup Finals for a team based on the west coast of the United States. It was also the 34th appearance for Montreal, their first since the 1989 Stanley Cup Finals. The Canadiens won the series four games to one to win the team's 24th Stanley Cup. The year 1993 was the 100th anniversary of the first awarding of the Stanley Cup in 1893, and the first Finals to start in the month of June. To date, the 1993 Canadiens are the last Stanley Cup championship team to be composed solely of North American-born players, and the last Canadian team to win the Stanley Cup.

The series is remembered for Kings defenceman Marty McSorley's penalty late in the third period of game two for using an illegal stick, in what proved to be the turning point in the 1993 Cup Finals. When McSorley entered the penalty box, Los Angeles held a 1–0 series lead, and a 2–1 score in the contest. The Canadiens then went on to score the equalizer on the ensuing power play, won game two in overtime, and then defeated the Kings in the next three games to win the Cup.

From the moment that McSorley was called for the penalty, the Kings failed to win another postseason game for the remainder of the 20th century, losing all the remaining games of the Finals, failing to qualify for the playoffs in five of the next seven seasons, and being swept out in the first round the other two times. Their next postseason win did not come until 2001, against the Detroit Red Wings. Meanwhile, the Canadiens did not appear in the Stanley Cup Finals again until 2021.

Paths to the Finals

Los Angeles had started well but then went through a terrible run of form from December to February, though they managed to rebound and clinch a playoff spot. Superstar Wayne Gretzky sat out from October to January due to injury. Los Angeles did not have home ice advantage for all four rounds of the playoffs, and was the only club to face Canadian teams in every round. To reach the final, Los Angeles defeated the Calgary Flames 4–2, the Vancouver Canucks 4–2 and the Toronto Maple Leafs 4–3.

Montreal defeated their in-province rivals, the Quebec Nordiques, 4–2, the Buffalo Sabres 4–0, and the New York Islanders 4–1. The Canadiens initially lost the first two games in round one against the rival Nordiques, due in part to a couple of weak goals let in by star Montreal goaltender (and Quebec City native) Patrick Roy. Afterward, a newspaper in Roy's hometown district suggested that he be traded, while Nordiques goaltending coach Dan Bouchard also proclaimed that his team had solved Roy. The Canadiens then responded by winning the next four games to eliminate the Nordiques, then swept the Sabres, and took the first three games against the Islanders, tying a record of 11 consecutive playoff wins.

Both conferences saw numerous upsets, with the top two teams in each conference being eliminated before the conference finals. The Campbell Conference saw last year's Cup finalists, Chicago Blackhawks, get swept in the opening round by the St. Louis Blues. With their rivals the Boston Bruins being eliminated by the Sabres in the division semifinals, as well as the two-time defending Cup champions Pittsburgh Penguins being eliminated by the Islanders in the division final, Montreal's path to their first final since  became much easier. The Bruins had eliminated the Canadiens in the playoffs for three straight years, mainly due to Boston goaltender Andy Moog, who was often referred to as the "greatest Hab killer" the Bruins ever had. In addition, the Kings path through the playoffs was made easier since their nemesis, the Edmonton Oilers, who had eliminated the Kings from the playoffs in 1990, 1991, and 1992, failed to qualify for the 1993 playoffs.

Game summaries
This was the last Stanley Cup Finals series played in the Montreal Forum, and the last time Wayne Gretzky competed in the Finals. The Kings were appearing in the Finals for the first time in their 26-year history. They did not appear in the Finals again until 2012, where they faced the New Jersey Devils and won their first Stanley Cup. Montreal's victory is the most recent championship won by a Canadian team. They did not appear in the Finals again until 2021, where they lost to the Tampa Bay Lightning.

Game one

In game one at the Montreal Forum, the Kings jumped out to a 1–0 lead on Luc Robitaille's power-play goal at 3:03 of the first period. The Canadiens tied the game late in the first on Ed Ronan's goal at 18:09 (although it was merely a pass that Gretzky accidentally deflected into his own net). Robitaille would break the 1–1 deadlock with his second power-play goal of the game at 17:41 of the second period. Jari Kurri added an insurance marker off a Patrice Brisebois turnover at 1:51 of the third, and Gretzky sealed the 4–1 win for the Kings with an empty net goal at 18:02.

Game two

The turning point of the series for the Canadiens came late in the third period of game two. With the Kings leading by a score of 2–1, Canadiens head coach Jacques Demers called for a measurement of the curve of Kings defenceman Marty McSorley's stick. The stick was deemed illegal and McSorley was given a two-minute minor penalty for unsportsmanlike conduct. As it was late in the game and Montreal was facing the prospect of going to Los Angeles down two games to none, Demers pulled goalie Patrick Roy, producing a 6-on-4 advantage for the Canadiens. Montreal's Eric Desjardins scored from the point to tie the game at two and force overtime. Desjardins then scored his third goal of the game 51 seconds into overtime to give Montreal the win and the momentum heading toward games three and four at the Great Western Forum. Desjardins is the first and only defenceman to score a hat trick in the Cup Finals; before this game he had scored just two playoff goals.

Reports suggested Canadiens head coach Jacques Demers knew which of the Kings' hockey sticks to challenge, thanks to a Montreal Forum employee assigned to the Kings' locker room who temporarily moved the Kings' portable stick rack to the Montreal's locker room. Demers has denied this and credited captain Guy Carbonneau with spotting McSorley's illegal stick.

Game three

In game three in Los Angeles, the Canadiens jumped out to a 1–0 first period lead on a tip-in goal by Brian Bellows at 10:26, and Gilbert Dionne and Mathieu Schneider increased that lead to 3–0 at 2:41 and 3:02 of the second period. After a memorable check by long-time Kings defenceman Mark Hardy on Montreal's Mike Keane, the Kings fired back to tie the game in the second period on goals by Robitaille, Tony Granato and Gretzky. With time running out in the third period, Montreal captain Guy Carbonneau appeared to cover the puck in the goal crease, which with such little time remaining (12 seconds) would have resulted in a penalty shot for Los Angeles. But the referee ruled that the puck had been shot by a Kings player into Carbonneau's equipment, and so the period remained scoreless. After the series, the referee admitted that he had made a mistake on the call. The game went into overtime and Montreal's John LeClair scored the winner just 34 seconds into the extra period, giving the Canadiens their ninth consecutive overtime playoff victory.

Game four

Game four was a carbon copy of the previous game. Montreal bolted out to an early 2–0 lead, but the Kings fought back in the second period with goals by Mike Donnelly at 6:33 and McSorley on a power play at 19:56. As was the case in game three, the third period in game four ended up scoreless. Once again, it was John LeClair who was the hero for Montreal as he netted the overtime winner 14:37 into the extra period, banking the puck off the leg of sliding Los Angeles defenceman Darryl Sydor. In doing so, he became the first player since Montreal legend Maurice "Rocket" Richard in 1951 to score playoff overtime goals in consecutive games, and giving Montreal an NHL-record ten consecutive overtime wins in the 1993 playoffs.

Game five

Leading the series three games to one, the Canadiens headed back home for game five. After Paul DiPietro gave Montreal a 1–0 lead with a goal at 15:10 of the first period, McSorley tied the game for the Kings at 2:40 of the second period. The Canadiens' response was swift as Kirk Muller scored just 71 seconds later, and then Stephane Lebeau scored a power-play goal at 11:31 to give the Canadiens a 3–1 lead after two periods. DiPietro scored again at 12:06 to give Montreal a 4–1 lead. That ended up being the final score, with Muller's goal turning out to be the game winner. Gretzky did not manage a shot on net during the entire game.

With the win, the Canadiens won the series four games to one and clinched their 24th Stanley Cup championship. Montreal goaltender Patrick Roy won the Conn Smythe Trophy as the most valuable player of the Stanley Cup Playoffs for the second time (he won it for the first time in ).

Team rosters
Years indicated in boldface under the "Finals appearance" column signify that the player won the Stanley Cup in the given year.

Los Angeles Kings

Montreal Canadiens

Stanley Cup engraving
The 1993 Stanley Cup was presented to Canadiens captain Guy Carbonneau by NHL Commissioner Gary Bettman following the Canadiens 4–1 win over the Kings in game five.

The following Canadiens players and staff had their names engraved on the Stanley Cup

1992–93 Montreal Canadiens

Riot

The 1993 Montreal Stanley Cup riot occurred in Montreal after the Montreal Canadiens won their 24th Stanley Cup. People poured into the streets of the city and some began to commit acts of vandalism and violence while the Canadiens were celebrating inside the Montreal Forum. In the epicentre of the riot on Saint Catherine Street, stores were looted and police cruisers were set ablaze. The riot caused $2.5 million in damage, $ in  dollars.

At the high point of the riot 980 officers were dispatched and they made 115 arrests. The police reported 47 police cars damaged, 8 of those 47 cars were completely destroyed. Rioters were arrested after they broke windows, looted stores and set fires. Some of the rioters were suspected of planning to loot stores using the Canadiens' victory celebration as a decoy. 168 were injured, including 49 police officers.

Due to the Kings being the Canadiens' opponents, most of the Los Angeles news media, including the Los Angeles Times and the Daily News, also covered the riot; Times staff writer Helene Elliott was pressed into service as a news reporter minutes after the riot began.

Aftermath
In the following year, the Canadiens lost in the first round in seven games to the Boston Bruins. The Los Angeles Kings, on the other hand, missed the playoffs after they reached the finals.

Later that same year, the Toronto Blue Jays won the 1993 World Series over the Philadelphia Phillies, marking the first time Canadian teams had won multiple world championships amongst the four major North American sports.

Television
In Canada, the series was televised in English on the CBC and in French on SRC. In the United States, the series was broadcast on ESPN. This was the ESPN's first Cup Finals coverage since 1988. However, ESPN was blacked out in the Los Angeles market because of Prime Ticket's local rights to the Kings games.

References
Inline citations

Bibliography

 
Los Angeles Kings games
Montreal Canadiens games
Stanley Cup Finals
Stanley Cup
Stanley Cup Finals
Stanley Cup Finals
20th century in Los Angeles County, California
Ice hockey competitions in Montreal
Sports competitions in Inglewood, California
1990s in Montreal
Stanley Cup Finals
Ice hockey competitions in California